Crocothemis striata, the black-legged scarlet, is a species of dragonfly found in Madagascar.

References

External links

Libellulidae
Insects described in 1981